Fyodor Ivanovich Datlin was a Russian and Soviet figure skater.

Datlin was a two-time champion of Russia in men's single skating (in 1906 and 1908) and the 1905 silver medalist. In 1920 he won the gold medal at the first ever Soviet Figure Skating Championships.

He also participated in the 1909 World Figure Skating Championships in Stockholm, but did poorly, placing last of five competitors.

Competitive highlights

References

External links 
 Fyodor Datlin at Fskate.ru

Russian male single skaters
Soviet male single skaters
Figure skaters from Saint Petersburg
Year of birth missing
Year of death missing